The Victory Shield 2009 is the 64th edition of the Victory Shield, an annual football tournament that began in 1925 and is competed for by the Under 16 level teams of England, Scotland, Northern Ireland and Wales. It was held from 1 October to 26 November 2009 and was won by England for the 9th time in a row.

Venues

Final table

Matches and Results

Result

See also
Victory Shield

External links
Official Victory Shield website

2006
2009–10 in English football
2009–10 in Scottish football
2009–10 in Welsh football
2009–10 in Northern Ireland association football
October 2009 sports events in the United Kingdom
November 2009 sports events in the United Kingdom